A teether, teething toy, or chew toy is a device given to teething infants. Most modern teethers are silicone, but can also be made of wood or rubber. Some teethers are filled with a fluid or gel that can be frozen or refrigerated. They differ from pacifiers in that they are intended to be chewed, rather than sucked on. They come in a variety of different shapes. Teethers may help relieve teething pain and help new teeth penetrate the gum, as well as provide a form of entertainment. Teething necklaces and teething bracelets may pose a choking hazard to infants and toddlers depending on the teething parts, and have prompted recalls. Teethers filled with liquid have also been recalled because of bacterial contamination. Early teethers were often teething rings.

Teething biscuits, like rusks and ladyfingers, can also be given for teething.

References

Infancy
Teeth
Babycare
Rubber toys
Toy recalls